Mikołaj Jan Piskorski who often goes by Misiek (born April 16, 1973 in Warsaw, Poland) is Dean of IMD South East Asia and a Professor of Strategy and Innovation at IMD Business School. He is known for his research in the area of digital transformation, on-line social platforms and study of how companies leverage social platforms to improve their profitability.

Education and career to date 
Professor Piskorski received both his bachelor's and master's degrees from Christ's College at the University of Cambridge where he studied Economics and Politics. He also received a masters in Sociology and a Ph.D. in Organizational Behavior from Harvard University.

After teaching at Stanford's Graduate School of Business, Misiek returned to Harvard in 2004 where he has taught classes such as Competing with Social Networks and Building and Sustaining Competitive Advantage to MBA students, along with several other classes in the executive education program.

He wrote written a number of Harvard Business School cases on various social platforms, including Facebook, Zynga, LinkedIn, eHarmony, Twitter, MySpace, Friendster, Meetup, mixi, adMob, Wikipedia, and Yelp. Misiek has also written articles that have appeared in peer-reviewed publications such as American Journal of Sociology, Administrative Science Quarterly, Management Science, and Social Forces. He has also been cited by popular publications such as the New York Times, Business 2.0, and Investors Business Daily.

Partial publications list

Books 

 A Social Strategy: How We Profit from Social Media (Princeton, NJ: Princeton University Press, 2014).

Articles 

 
 
  Co-authored with Tiziana Casciaro.
  Co-authored with Tiziana Casciaro.
  Co-authored with Rakesh Khurana.

References 

1973 births
Living people
Writers from Warsaw
Harvard University alumni
Alumni of Christ's College, Cambridge